Louis Scolnik (born February 14, 1923) is an American former attorney and jurist who served as the 94th Associate Justice of the Maine Supreme Judicial Court from September 7, 1983 to July 31, 1988.

Biography

Early life and Military service
Born in Lewiston, Maine, Scolnik became enamored of jazz music at the age of 12. Scolnik attended Bates College in Lewiston, Maine, where he was part of the Bates College jazz ensemble.

While studying there, the Japanese attack on Pearl Harbor occurred. Scolnik enrolled in the college's V-12 Naval Program. After graduating in 1945, he fought in World War II, first deployed as an officer on a U.S. Navy infantry landing ship, which received heavy fire just before the surrender of Japan. While serving, he found other musicians in the service and held impromptu jam sessions.

Legal career
Scolnik attended Georgetown Law School, graduating in 1952. He thereafter became active in a local branch of NAACP and chaired the Maine Advisory Committee to the U.S. Commission on Civil Rights, seeking to end housing discrimination against black service members stationed in Maine. He was a founding member of the Maine chapter of the American Civil Liberties Union.

Scolnik was a judge of the Maine Superior Court, where in 1981, he was named presiding justice for Maine's Superior Court region II, covering seven counties. He served on the Maine Supreme Court from 1983 to 1988. One of the first decisions he authored as a justice struck down a local obscenity statute in his hometown of Lewiston, which Scolnik observed "would reduce the adult population to reading only what is fit for juveniles".

Post-legal career
After retiring from the court, Scolnik again formed a jazz band, the Golden Years Trio, which played for seniors for several years, until the death of one of its members.

Personal life
In 1951, Scolnik married Paula, a schoolteacher, with whom he had three daughters. She died on August 5, 2018, at the age of 90, and after 67 years of marriage. He currently resides in Andover, Massachusetts

Honours

The ACLU instituted the Justice Louis Scolnik Award in recognition to"member s of th community who have demonstrated an outstanding commitment to civil liberties''

It was announced in 2019, that he would receive the ACLUA's annual award for "Lifetime Service"

References

1923 births
Living people
Justices of the Maine Supreme Judicial Court
People from Lewiston, Maine
Bates College alumni
Georgetown University Law Center alumni
American jazz musicians
United States Navy personnel of World War II
People from Auburn, Maine